Marcos Camozzato (born June 17, 1983 in Porto Alegre, Rio Grande do Sul) is a retired Brazilian footballer who last played for Roeselare in the Belgian Second Division.

Career
He started in the youth categories of Internacional, known only by his first name, Marcos. Inter's president at the time, Fernando Carvalho, suggested the change to only Camozzatto, the surname of his Italian origins, because it could be more attractive for the European leagues, where the boy could get dual citizenship (in a similar case of his fellows from Inter's youth team, Rafael Sobis and Marcelo Labarthe – differently from them, he would be known only by his surname).

On 16 June 2010, Club Brugge signed the Brazilian right-back from League rival Standard Liège on a three-year contract.

Honours
 Standard Liège
 Belgian First Division A: 2007–08, 2008–09
 Belgian Super Cup: 2008, 2009

References

1983 births
Footballers from Porto Alegre
Brazilian people of Italian descent
Living people
Brazilian footballers
Sport Club Internacional players
Standard Liège players
Club Brugge KV players
Associação Atlética Ponte Preta players
K.S.V. Roeselare players
Campeonato Brasileiro Série A players
Belgian Pro League players
Challenger Pro League players
Brazilian expatriate footballers
Brazilian expatriate sportspeople in Belgium
Expatriate footballers in Belgium

Association football defenders